Maksym Andriyovych Biletskyi (born 7 January 1980) is a retired Ukrainian football midfielder.

External links 
Profile on Official Website
Stats on Odessa Football website

Ukrainian footballers
Ukrainian expatriate footballers
1980 births
People from Romny
Living people
FC Chornomorets Odesa players
FC Rostov players
FC Moscow players
PFC CSKA Moscow players
FC Shinnik Yaroslavl players
Russian Premier League players
Expatriate footballers in Russia
Ukrainian expatriate sportspeople in Russia
Association football midfielders
Sportspeople from Sumy Oblast